The clumping factor is a measurement of how density varies within a gaseous medium, and is commonly used in astrophysical settings where gas is not distributed uniformly. Gas densities can vary over many orders of magnitude, from the low density plasma in the Intergalactic medium between galaxies, to the neutral and dense molecular regions in the interstellar medium inside of galaxies. Moreover, gas throughout space is turbulent implying it has density structure on all spatial scales.

The amount that gas clumps is important to know in astronomy when trying to infer gas properties from observations. The clumping of gas, and not just the amount of gas present, affects the luminosity of gas as it cools.  The clumping factor is a measure of the density variation of a medium. It is defined as: 
 
where averaging is spatial. It is related to the variance of the density field by the square of the average density:

Cooling rates and emission scale as the particle number density squared (collision rates have this scaling). Therefore, the clumping factor can be used to convert from density inferred by emission observations assuming uniform density, to true average gas density:

References 

Space plasmas